Prionosternum is a genus of Australian white tailed spiders that was first described by R. A. Dunn in 1951.  it contains only three species: P. nitidiceps, P. porongurup, and P. scutatum. Originally placed with the ground spiders, it was moved to the Lamponidae in 2000.

See also
 List of Lamponidae species

References

Araneomorphae genera
Lamponidae
Spiders of Australia